Tariel may refer to:

 Tariel Bitsadze, Georgian karateka and mixed martial artist
 Tariel Dadiani, Prince of Mingrelia, Georgia in 1793–1794 and in 1802
 Tarieli Melelashvili, Georgian wrestler
 Tariel Vasadze, Ukrainian businessman
 Tariel Zharkymbaev, Kyrgyzstani cross-country skier
 Tariel Zintiridis, Greek judoka
 Prince Tariel from The Knight in the Panther's Skin